The Manifesto of the People of Brabant was a document made public at the start of the Brabant Revolution in 1789 proclaiming the end of the domination of the House of Austria over the Duchy of Brabant. It was first written in French and then printed in French and Dutch.

Background
In October 1789, the leader of the "Statists", Henri Van der Noot and the general Jean-André van der Meersch led  a small army of patriots from the Dutch Republic where they had been in exile into the Duchy of Brabant, then under Austrian rule. The first significant town liberated was Hoogstraten and it was there that van der Noot made the declaration public to his army.

Manifesto
The manifesto was first read on 24 October 1789 in the town of Hoogstraten, though it had been published on the previous day by the Committee of Breda.

The Duke of Brabant was obliged by the terms of the Joyous Entry to respect the privileges of the people of Brabant. The element which sparked the revolution was the infringement of the terms, meaning that the declaration also declared Duke Joseph of Brabant deposed from his position.

The declaration led, in January 1790, to the establishment of the United Belgian States.

See also 
 Brabant Revolution
 Committee of United Belgians and Liégeois
 Manifesto of the Province of Flanders
 Treaty of Union (1790)

References

External links

Manifeste des Brabançons , text of the manifesto

Brabant Revolution
Political manifestos
1789 documents
Declarations of independence
Hoogstraten
1789 in the Habsburg monarchy
1789 in the Holy Roman Empire